Tracy Li (born 1972, in Hong Kong) is a South African ballet dancer of Chinese origin. She trained at The Christine Liao School of Ballet before receiving a scholarship from The Royal Hong Kong Jockey Club to study at the Australian Ballet School.  At age 16, she joined the Hong Kong Ballet, before she left in 1992 for Durban, South Africa. She joined Napac Dance Company; however, she left the following year to join the Cape Town City Ballet, where she is currently a senior principal. She is known for her partnership with Daniel Rajna and together they have regularly toured as guest artists in Zimbabwe and Hong Kong. They were also both invited to the 2004 Miami Dance Festival. She retired in August 2007 after performances of Camille.

Awards 
 The Best Professional Ballet Dancer award in The Sanlam International Ballet Competition, 1993
 Balletomane Award for best female dancer, 1994, 1997, 1999, 2001 and 2003
 Nederberg Award, 1997
 Daphne Levy Award for her partnership with Daniel Rajna, 2001
She has also danced in the National Ballet Competition in China in 1986.

Notable roles 
 Giselle in Giselle
 Coppélia in Coppélia
 Carmen in Carmen
 Princess Aurora in Sleeping Beauty
 Juliet in Romeo and Juliet
 Sugar Plum Fairy in The Nutcracker
 Camille in Camille
 Odette/Odile in Swan Lake
 Cinderella in Cinderella

External links 
  Tracy Li at the Dance Directory
  Cape Town City Ballet Company
  Pas de Deux Couple Tracy Li & Daniel Rajna
 Dancers exit stage for new future

1972 births
Living people
South African ballerinas
Australian Ballet School alumni